MS SuperStar II is a ferry owned by the Greek/Cypriot Seajets, and operated on their service between Sandefjord and Strömstad from 16th June 2000 until 20th November 2022. She was built in 1985 as MS Peder Paars by Nakskov Skibsværft, Nakskov, Denmark for DSB Færger (the ferry division of the Danish State Railways). Between 1991 and 2000 she sailed as MS Stena Invicta for Sealink Stena Line and Stena Line. In 1998 she was chartered to Silja Line under the marketing name MS Wasa Jubilee. In May 2000 the Stena Invicta started operating for Color Line and received the name MS Color Viking.

SuperStar II is certified for 2000 passengers and 370 cars.

Concept and construction

In September 1983 DSB Færger ordered two relatively large ferries for service on the intra-Denmark Århus—Kalundborg route from the Nakskov Skibsværft in Nakskov, Denmark. Although ordered by the ferry division of the Danish State Railways, the ships did not have the facilities for transporting trains, but were constructed to transport road freight and passengers. Both ships were named after characters from the works of Ludvig Holberg, a Norwegian-born writer considered to be the father of modern Danish literature. First of the ships, delivered in 1985, was named MS Peder Paars after the poem Peder Paars. The second, delivered a years later, was named  after the protagonist in Niels Klim's Underground Travels.

Service history

The Peder Paars was delivered to DSB Færger on 1985-10-18, but it was not until a month later that she entered service on the Århus—Kalundborg route. Århus was also her port of registry at the time. She and her sister remained in service for five years, until in October 1990 both ships were sold to Stena Line, to be delivered in May 1991. The following day the Peder Paars was renamed Stena Invicta and sailed to the Schichau-Seebeckswerft shipyard in Bremerhaven, Germany for rebuilding for service in the English Channel for Stena Line's subsidiary Sealink Stena Line. For this purpose the ship was re-registered in the United Kingdom, with Dover as her homeport. On 1991-08-08 the Stena Invicta entered service on the Dover—Calais route.

Following the formation of P&O Stena Line, the Stena Invicta was laid up on 1998-02-18. In April of the same year she was chartered to Silja Line, Finland for the duration of the 1998 northern hemisphere summer season. Her registered name remained Stena Invicta, but in Silja Line marketing the ship was referred to with the name Wasa Jubilee in honour of the 50th anniversary of ferry operations from Vaasa, Finland. The marketing name Wasa Jubilee was also painted in large letters on the ship's side, alongside the company name. The ship stayed in Vaasa—Umeå service for Silja Line from 1998-04-20 until 1998-09-15. The following month the Stena Invicta arrived in Zeebrugge, where she was laid up. In November 1999 her registered owners were changed from Stena Line to P&O Stena Line. In December she was chartered to Stena Line U.K., entering service on the Holyhead—Dún Laoghaire route on 1999-12-12. At the end of February 2000 her route was changed to Fishguard—Rosslare, but she was withdrawn from service already on 2000-03-20.

In April 2000 the Stena Invicta was chartered to the Norway-based Color Line, with a purchase option included in the charter agreement. The ship was re-registered at Nassau, Bahamas, rebuilt at Drammen, Norway and renamed Color Viking. On 2000-06-14 the ship entered service on Color Line's Sandefjord—Strömstad service. In May of the following year Color Line utilized their purchase option on the ship. She was subsequently re-registered in Norway, with Sandefjord as her homeport.

In November 2022 Color Line announced that the ship would be pulled from service along with the freight ship Color Carrier on the Oslo-Kiel route due to rising fuel and energy costs.

References

External links 

 Color Line official website for Color Viking

Ferries of Norway
Passenger ships of Norway
Sandefjord
Ships built in Denmark
Water transport in Vestfold og Telemark
1984 ships
Color Line (ferry operator)
Merchant ships of Norway